Francisca "Panchita" Subirana Wolf (also y Lobo; 24 January 1900 – March 1981) was a Spanish tennis player.

Biography
Subirana was born in Barcelona. She won the city's tennis tournament from 1916 to 1920 five times in a row. In 1920, she reached the final of the World Hard Court Championships which she lost to Dorothy Holman in straight sets. She was in the Spanish squad for the 1920 Summer Olympics at Antwerp but didn't play her first match against Winifred McNair.

Around 1922, Subirana retired from tennis. In 1924, she married Ricardo Wolf (1887–1981), a German Jewish immigrant, in Cuba (where their names were changed to y Lobo, the Spanish word for "wolf"). In 1961, the couple moved to Israel where Ricardo was assigned the Cuban ambassador by Fidel Castro. After Ricardo retired from his diplomatic post in 1973, the Wolfs spent the rest of their lives in Israel. In 1975, they founded the Wolf Foundation which awards the Wolf Prize since 1978. 
Ricardo Wolf died at Herzliya in February 1981, and Francisca died there one month later at an age of 81.

References

External links 
 

1900 births
1981 deaths
Spanish female tennis players
Tennis players from Barcelona
Date of death missing
Sportswomen from Catalonia
Spanish emigrants to Cuba